One Rank One Pension (OROP), or "same pension, for same rank, for same length of service, irrespective of the date of retirement", is a longstanding demand of the Indian armed forces and veterans. The demand for pay-pension equity, which underlies the OROP concept, was provoked by the exparte decision by the Indira Gandhi-led Indian National Congress (INC) government, in 1973, two years after the historic victory in the 1971 Bangladesh war.  

In 1986, the sense of unease and distrust prompted by the Third Central Pay Commission (CPC) was exacerbated by the Rajiv Gandhi led Indian National Congress (I) Government's decision to implement Rank Pay, which reduced basic pay of captain, majors, lt-colonel, colonels, and brigadiers, and their equivalent in the air-force, and the navy, relative to basic pay scales of civilian and police officers. The decision to reduce the basic pay of these ranks, implemented without consulting the armed forces, created radically asymmetries between police-military ranks, affected the pay, and pension of tens of thousands of officers and veterans, spawned two decades of contentious litigation by veterans. It became a lingering cause of distrust between the armed forces veterans and the MOD, which the government did little to ameliorate.

In 2008, the Manmohan Singh led United Progressive Alliance (UPA) Government in the wake of the Sixth Central Pay Commission (6CPC), discarded the concept of rank-pay. Instead it introduced Grade pay, and Pay bands, which instead of addressing the rank, pay, and pension asymmetries caused by 'rank pay' dispensation, reinforced existing asymmetries. The debasing of armed forces ranks was accompanied by decision in 2008 to create hundreds of new posts of secretaries, special Secretaries, director general of police (DGP) at the apex grade pay level to ensure that all civilian and police officers, including defence civilian officers, retire at the highest pay grade with the apex pay grade pensions with One Rank One Pay (OROP).

Background 
Between 2008–14, during the tenure of the UPA Government led by Prime Minister Manmohan Singh, myriad Armed Forces grievances prompted by perceived inequities subsumed with OROP issue to make OROP a potent rallying call that resonated with veterans of all ranks. Against the background of perceived discrimination, and slights, and dismissive response of the Government, armed forces veterans, in the later half 2008, started a campaign, of nationwide public protests, which included hunger strikes. In response to the OROP protests, which underscored the growing pay-pension-status asymmetries, the UPA Government, in 2011, appointed a parliamentary committee which found merit in the veterans demands for OROP.

Issues
The causes that inform the OROP protest movement are not pension alone, as armed forces veterans have often tried to make clear, and the parliamentary committee recorded. The issues, veterans emphasize, are of justice, equity, honor, and national security. The failure to address issue of pay-pension equity, and the underlying issue of honor, is not only an important cause for the OROP protest movement, but its escalation.  The causes and grievances that inform OROP protesters and their high ranking supporters, in addition to failure of the government to implement OROP, are a string of contentious decision taken by UPA Government, in 2008–9, in the wake of Sixth Central Pay Commission (6 CPC), that sharply degraded Armed Forces pay grades and ranks. Decisions, that have had a radical impact on the armed forces sense of self-esteem, honor, and their trust in the government and security bureaucracy, some of which come to dominate policy under the UPA government, and remain unaddressed by the BJP Government, are outlined in the succeeding paragraphs

Reduction of armed forces pensions
In 1973, the Indira Gandhi led Congress (I) terminated ‘One Rank One Pension’ the basis for deciding pension of Indian Armed Forces Personnel ‘which had been in vogue for 26 years since independence’ through an ex parte administrative order. In addition, the Government, on the basis of the report of third Pay commission, from which Armed Forces representation was excluded, and which was dominated by bureaucrats, increased the pension of civilians, who retired at 58, from 30 to 50 percent, a net increase of 20 percent; and reduced the pension of soldier, Non Commissioned Officers (NCOs) and Junior commissioned Officers (JCOs), by 20 percent, from 70 to 50 percent of basic pay, with the caveat that for full pension the minimum service was 33 years. But as soldiers in 1973 retired after 15 years service, at the age of 33–36, they got less than 30 percent of the pay as pension. Soldiers pension was thus decreased not by 20 percent but 40 percent from 70 to 30 percent. In addition to down grading military pensions, the government down graded the status of soldier by equating "infantry soldier with less than three years' service" with a "semi-skilled/unskilled labour". The decision was announced two months after Field Marshal Sam Manekshaw, who led the army in the victorious 1971 war, retired from service. The reason for depressing the armed Forces pensions, which continues to rankle veterans and servings personnel, given by the Congress I government was that it wanted to ensure ‘equivalence’ of Armed Forces pensions with civilians.

Rank Pay

The concept of rank-pay introduced in 1986, affected tens of thousand of serving and retired officers of the three armed forces. It started the process of undermining military ranks and making them subordinate to the police. Its discriminatory provisions reinforced the growing sense of distrust between the MOD and the veterans. It debased the military ranks of captain, majors, lt-colonel, colonels, and brigadiers, and their equivalent in the air-force and the Indian Navy.

The legacy of rank-pay, and 4CPC, found echo in the 6CPC, and the 7CPC and continues to be a cause of distrust, false parities and anomalous pay scales. The implementation of BJP Government in 2016 of separate pay matrix for the police, and the armed forces, accentuated the anomalies in time scale pay grades between armed forces officers and the IPS, which had remain unresolved since 1986, when the congress government had reduced the basic pay of armed forces officers relative to police officers, by deducting 'rank-pay' from the basic-pay. The 7CPC decision on pay grades for the armed forces were called blatantly 'discriminatory' by former Chief of Indian Army General Ved P Malik, who said the intent was to degrade armed forces ranks in comparison with police time scale ranks.

OROP-2008 for Civil-Police Officers
Even though OROP was not a transparently stated civil service or police officers demand, Prime Minister Manmohan Singh rewarded senior civil servant and IPS officers with OROP at the apex scale, the highest pay grade in the government. The decision to grant ' OROP' to the senior most government servants was taken, not by parliament, or ministerial committee, but by bureaucrats in Department of Pensions and Pensioners' Welfare (DOP&PW), and the Prime Minister's Office. According to Avay Shukla, a former officer of the Indian Administrative Service, ( 1975 batch, Himachal Pradesh cadre), who retired at the apex grade, and is recipient of Apex Grade OROP-2008 linked pension, the decision to grant OROP-2008 to the civil and police services was implemented not by public notification, but a cunningly worded internal memorandum issued by Department of Pensions and Pensioners' Welfare, a department under the Prime Minister's office. Avay Shukla, in 2015, at the height of the OPOP protests, in a newspaper article revealed that apex OROP for the civil services was done slyly. As 'Apex-OROP' was done secretly it has neither been discussed or scrutinized by the media, or the Ministry of Finance, and for this reason remained little known, and only gained salience after the veterans started their protests.

'Apex-OROP-2008', is not as selective as it appears. Apex grade pay OROP pension covers thousands of retired, serving, and future Civil Service officers, including 4802 Indian Administrative Service officers, 600 Indian Foreign Service officers, and 4720 the IPS officers majority of whom because of their cadre structures( proliferation of apex ranks) are guaranteed that they will retire at the apex scale, not with standing what their responsibilities or duties entail.

Most senior police and civil service officer are shy to acknowledge that they had been granted Apex OROP. Prasad, IAS, former defence secretary, who retired on 30 June 2004, on 22 August 2015, in a debate on national TV denied that he was getting Apex-OROP. J.K. Khanna, an IPS officer, who retired as DGP, in 2011, and Avay Shukla, IAS, who retired in 2010, confirmed in 2015 that they like other IAS and IPS officers are getting Apex OROP.

In contrast to almost hundred percent Apex-OROP coverage to past and future retiree from the civil services, including majority of defence civilian officers in Ministry of Defence responsible for providing secretarial, logistic, and rear area services to the Armed Forces, like accounts and audit, land, only one tenth of one percent of the armed forces officers, as 'stratagem' and hedge against their opposition to the scheme, were also included in the apex OROP scheme.
Those covered include the three heads of the Defence Forces, Army Commanders, and few other Lt Generals, and their equivalents in the Navy, and Air Force. The attempt to buy the silence of the Chiefs of the armed Forces on an issue that affects the entire officers corps, not unexpectedly, has not gone down well with veterans. Those excluded included Lt Generals, Major Generals, Vice Admirals, and Rear Admirals, and Air Marshals, the commanders of the Armed Forces largest formations: its Corps, Divisions, air commands, bases, fleets and training establishments.

Sanction of Apex-OROP to thousands of officials, among other factors, has contributed to wide support that OROP protest enjoys; it has become an additional "causus belli" for the veterans protest over OROP. It is also the probable cause for the unprecedented letter by former Chiefs of Defence Forces of India to the Government declaring their support for OROP for the Armed Forces.

Non Functional Upgradation (NFU) for police officers and others
Sanction of OROP at apex scale to all civil services and police officers was accompanied by grant of "Non Functional Upgrade" (NFU) also called "non-functional financial up-gradation" (NFFU)  to all civil services including the Indian Police Service by the Congress(I) led United Progressive Alliance(UPA) Government, in 2008, to reward civil servants of 49 'Organized Central Group A Services', with automatic time bound pay promotions till the Higher Administrative Grade(HAG), a grade equated by Government with Lt Generals, Vice Admirals, and Air Marshals of Armed Forces. 

The unexplained exclusion of Armed Forces officers corps from the NFU, despite representation by the Chief of Staff, has wide-ranging implications : it impacts adversely the pay and pension structures, of colonels, brigadier and generals, and their equivalents in the navy and the air-force; it like OROP, become an emotive 'honor' issue; and, according to former senior military commanders, has had a corrosive impact on the Armed Forces morale, status, cohesion, and national security,  Despite the serious long term implications of NFU, the issue was ignored by the UPA government, and even the BJP Government has chosen not to dwell on it.

Up Graduation of heads of Central and State Police Forces
In addition to NFU, Apex OROP for police and civil servants, the UPA Government, in 2008, in recognition of the growing influence of Indian Police service in Ministry of Home (MHA), India's Interior Ministry, promoted the heads of the Central Reserve Police Force (CRPF), Border Security Force (BSF), and even of the smaller MHA Forces, like the Indo-Tibetan Border Police (ITBP), Central Industrial Security Force (CISF) (CISF) and Sashastra Seema Bal (SSB), The Railway Police, an IG level post, to the highest grade pay, or the apex scale, with pay scale of Rs.80,000 (fixed).  In addition, the Government upgraded heads of Police in all states, small or large, to Director General level to the highest grade pay, or the apex scale of Rs 80,000(fixed). This increased the number of IPS officers with several dozen, and made the Director Generals(DG) of these Central and state Forces at par in rank, pay, and status with Armed Forces senior most Lieutenant Generals, Air Marshals and Vice Admirals. The only MHA Armed Forces left out from up gradation to the higher grades was the Assam rifles, which is headed by an army Lt General, and the National Security Guard (NSG), which has a sizable army component.

The implication of these up gradations are many: the immediate effect was that scores of IPS officers not withstanding their responsibilities were immediately made senior in pay grade, and status to Armed forces formation and fleet commanders, who were denied proportionate upgrades despite representation by the COSC committee; mass up-gradation and creation of new posts of secretaries and special secretaries, and DGs with apex grade pay level, also affected relative pensions. 'Non-functional financial up-gradation'(NFU) was not extended to Armed Forces.

Asymmetries in time scale pay, pension, and allowances
The United Progressive Alliance (UPA) Government headed by Manmohan Singh, following the recommendations of the sixth pay commission, mandated with effect from 01.09.2008, six time scale pay grade promotions on completion of 4, 9, 13, 14, 16/18 years of service for all officers in civil services including defense civilian officers in the MOD responsible for providing secretarial, and logistic support to the armed forces, and police officers including custom, revenue, railway, and industrial police.  In comparison with six time-scale pay upgrades-promotions for the police, and defence civilian officers, the government approved three time scale pay upgrade-promotions for armed forces officers on completion of 2, 6, and 13 years of service, and at a far lower scale.

The decision by UPA government to introduce and aggravate asymmetries in the pay and pension and allowances between the different police organizations and armed forces even in the time scale pay grades, which the government did not explain, was cause of widespread disappointment amongst veterans and serving officers, and is a cause of orop protests movement and the continued support that it receives, and is likely to continue to get. 

The time scale promotions and related increases in pay, and allowances for government officers, including the police, are not contingent on vacancies or change in responsibilities. But are accompanied by increase pay, allowances and significant perks, difficult to accurately monetize, such as entitlements for hotel accommodation, class of air and rail travel, type of passport, use of staff car, size of office, increase in dedicated personal staff, etc.

Civil -Police- Military Officers Timescale promotions-pay grades (2008–16)

Asymmetries in time scale pay-grades for civil-police-and the armed forces officers as result of government decision in 2008 are tabulated below:

Ministry of Defence (MOD)
The higher bureaucracy in Indian Ministry of Defence (MOD), unlike defence ministries in other countries, is staffed entirely by civil service officers on deputation, who have never served in the armed forces or are familiar with its working or ethos. The MOD bureaucracy is drawn from the IAS and from other civil services, including from civilian services responsible for providing support services to the Armed Forces such as from the Indian Defence Estates Service(IDES), the Indian Defence Accounts Service (IDAS), and Indian Ordnance Factories Service. The entire MOD bureaucracy is covered by Apex OROP. MOD higher bureaucracy, despite being granted apex-OROP coverage, and NFU has opposed to OROP and NFU for the Armed Forces, for no clear reasons.

In 2011, during the tenure AK Antony, as Defence Minister, Neelam Nath, Secretary of Department of Ex-servicemen Welfare (Poorva Senani Kalyan Vibhag) from 1 June 2009 to 30 September 2011, on instructions of Shashi Kant Sharma, Defence Secretary, opposed OROP for the Armed Force, in her deposition to the Parliamentary Panel. The Koshyari Committee however, disagreed with submissions by the Ministry of Defence and found "merit in the demand for One Rank One Pension by Armed Forces Personnel", and urged the Government to implement OROP at the earliest.

The MOD is considered by most ex-servicemen, including former head of the Armed Forces, as permanent impediment to OROP, and welfare of ESM. Four former heads of the Armed Forces in August 2015, in an open letter addressed to the President of India flagged "The hostile approach of MoD bureaucracy" and its "antagonistic handling of problems related to pensions and allowances of aging veterans, war widows and battle-casualties".

Koshyari Committee, 2011
In response to the growing unease in the Armed Forces, and escalating protest by veterans, the Government set up of a ten-member all-party Parliamentary Panel, known as the Koshyari Committee after its chairman, Bhagat Singh Koshyari, a veteran Bharatiya Janata Party (BJP) Member of Parliament (MP), to examine the OROP issue. The Koshyari Committee after considering the evidence, and hearing oral depositions for eight months, submitted it report in December 2011. The committee unanimously found merit in OROP and strongly recommended its implementation. The Koshyari Committee (Petitions Committee of the Rajya Sabha), after examining the evidence, and taking into account the written and oral submissions by top officials from the Ministry of Defence (MOD) and Finance, veterans, and senior serving armed forces officers, over a six-month period (May–December 2011), defined the concept of OROP as follows:OROP "implies that uniform pension be paid to the Armed Forces Personnel retiring in the same rank with the same length of service irrespective of their date of retirement and any future enhancement in the rates of pension to be automatically passed on to the past pensioners." 

The Koshyari Committee definition of OROP was accepted by the Government, endorsed by Parliament, and by ex-servicemen and ex-servicemen organizations. It has since become basis for the ex-servicemen's demand for implementation of OROP. It is in sync with the ex-servicemen definition of OROP, according to which OROP "implies the grant of equal pension to soldiers of a particular rank, who have rendered the same length of service, irrespective of the date of their retirement".

On 27 February 2014, the MOD, in a meeting to discuss implementation of OROP attended by AK Antony, Defence Minister, Jitendra Singh, Minister of State, RK Mathur, Defence Secretary, Sangita Gairola, Secretary Department of Ex-Servicemen's Welfare, Arunava Dutt, Secretary Defence Finance, Vice Chiefs of the three Service, and Adjutant General of the Army, endorsed the Koshyari Committee's definition of OROP.

Despite the Koshyari Committee report, public commitments, including in the parliament, and visible disaffection among armed force veterans, the UPA Government was slow to reach out to the veterans and implement OROP.

BJP Government's Response (2014-2016) 

In May 2014, the UPA Government was replaced by the National Democratic Alliance (NDA) Government led by the Bharatiya Janata Party (BJP), which like the Congress Party, had included implementation of OROP in its election manifesto.

Narendra Modi
The BJP Prime Ministerial candidate, at a large election rally, in Rewari, Haryana, with General VK Singh, former Chief of Army Staff standing by his side, in the presence of tens of thousands Ex-Servicemen, declared that he will implement OROP, if elected. After Narendra Modi became Prime Minister there were more promises and public affirmations by him, and Manohar Parrikar, the Defence Minister, on the merits of OROP, and their intent to implement OROP. Most memorably on Diwali, at Siachen Glacier, in 2014, he told soldiers "It was in my destiny that One rank One pension has been fulfilled". On 30 May 2015, Prime Minister Narendra Modi, after more than a year of pledges and promises to implement OROP, controversially declared that the term OROP still needed to be defined. Modi's musings on the need for a new more acceptable OROP definition prompted widespread dismay, disappointment, and outrage among Armed Forces pensioners. On 31 May 2015, Modi in Mann Ki Baat asked Ex-Servicemen to remain patient, as he gets rid of the bureaucratic hassles. Modi's statement was widely perceived as a disingenuous attempt to delay, dilute, and deny OROP.

Arun Jaitley
Arun Jaitley, the former Finance Minister and former Defence Minister, widely believed to the obstacle to early implementation of OROP, opposed Koshyari Committee definition of OROP. On 31 August 2015 Arun Jaitley, without defining OROP, says, "I have my own formula on what OROP means. Somebody else may have their own formula on OROP but it has to be within reasonable and rational criteria. You can't have an OROP where pensions are revised every month or every year". Responding to Jaitley, the UPSEM alleges that Arun Jaitley, is manipulating the media, specifically, the Times of India, and India TV channel, to misinform the public, and exacerbate difference between the Officers and soldiers, on the OROP issue.

Protests by Veterans
On 15 June, ex-servicemen despairing of BJP promises, commenced nationwide protests, and hunger strikes. Even some protestors, who are Ex-Servicemen, threatened to resort to Rail Roko (Stop Trains) agitation.

Support
Four former chiefs of the Armed Forces of India, namely General S F Rodrigues, former COAS, and Admirals L Ramdas, Arun Prakash and Sureesh Mehta, former Chiefs of Naval Staff, in an open letter to President Pranab Mukherjee, Supreme Commander of the Armed Forces, on 13 August 2015, warned that the denigration and humiliation of veterans, and the Government handling of veterans and armed Forces issues, pose grave "implication for national security"

Police Assault in Delhi, 2015
On the morning of 14 August 2015, the eve India's 68 Independence day, and the day after General Ved P Mulik, former Army Chief, the government designated interlocutor informed Nripendra Misra in the Prime Minister Office (PMO) that the government offer on OROP for Ex-Servicemen was unacceptable, a contingent of police, drawn from the Delhi Police force, and the Central Reserve Police Force (CRPF), a paramilitary force for internal security and counterinsurgency, under Ministry of Home Affairs, on orders from Rajnath Singh, the Home Minister of India, and under the command of BS Bassi, Director General of Delhi Police, assaulted a peaceful gathering of Armed Forces veterans, families, and war widows, at Jantar Mantar, New Delhi. The police, not properly in their attempt to evict and frighten the gathered veterans, manhandled, 'pushed around', lathi charged, dragged, misbehaved, humiliated, menaced, and tore medals off the shirt of old veterans, including some in their eighties.

Senior Delhi Police officers sought to justifying their heavy handed actions by claiming that they acted "following a request by civic agency New Delhi Municipal Council". Senior officer of Delhi police also said that the veterans were viewed as security risk and security threat.

The orders to the Delhi Police to evict the veterans, which had their origins in the MHA and the PMO, was revoked on 14 August afternoon, following public outrage, by Kiren Rijiju, Minister of State for Home, who said, "I have asked the Commissioner of Police not to remove the ex-servicemen from Jantar Mantar and let them continue the protest".

Former Chiefs of the Armed Forces protest attack on veterans
On 17 August, 10 former Chiefs of the Armed Forces of India in an unprecedented joint open letter addressed to Narendra Modi, the Prime Minister, condemned the police action, and urged the PM to order an inquiry into the action by the Delhi Police. The Signatories to the letter included retired Generals Vishwa Nath Sharma, Shankar Roy Choudhary, Sundararajan Padmanabhan, Joginder Jaswant Singh, Deepak Kapoor and Bikram Singh; retired Air Chief Marshals Nirmal Chandra Suri and Shashindra Pal Tyagi, and retired Admiral Madhvendera Singh.

Rajnath Singh, Home Minister, instead of ordering inquiry into the police excesses as demanded by the former Chiefs of Staff, asked Bhim Sain Bassi, DG Delhi Police, to send an officer to meet veterans and apologize for the police action on 14 August. MK Meena, Delhi Police officer met the veterans and made a public apology. But the letter seeking an inquiry into the assault by the Chiefs of staff was ignored. No inquiry was held into circumstances prompting the police assault and excesses committed against the veterans.

Ex-Serviceman commits suicide over OROP
An Ex-Serviceman Ram Kishan Grewal committed suicide over delay in One Rank One Pension issue on 1 November 2016 consuming poison at Jantar-Mantar in New Delhi. Grewal has reportedly left a suicide note, stating that he was taking this extreme step for soldiers.

Veterans response to police attack
Ex-servicemen outraged by police assertion that they were considered a risk, and security threat, to the Independence day celebrations, retorted angrily "We served the country in protecting it and now we have become security threat."
Two days after the police assault, Colonel (Retd) Pushpender Singh (Ex-3 Grenadiers) and Havaldar (Retd) Major Singh (Ex-3 Sikh Light Infantry), same Regiment as Retired General Ved Malik, began hunger strike-unto-death at Jantar Mantar, to protest police brutality, and delay in government implementation of OROP. A day later on 18 August 2015 Havildar Ashok Chauhan, Corps of signals, joined in the hunger strike.

OROP Scheme

The Government in the face of mounting protest and resentment among veterans announced, in September 2015, that it would implement the new pension scheme, commonly referred to as One rank One Pension or OROP. Five months later in February 2016, it issued orders to implement the scheme. The scheme announced by the Government failed to satisfy the leaders of the protest movement, who vowed to take the government to court.

Potential beneficiaries of OROP
Potential beneficiaries of OROP is about 2.6 million ex-servicemen, and 60,000 widows, including war widows, i.e., a combined total of 3.2 million, of whom about 86 percent are widows, JCOs, NCOs, and other ranks, about 14 percent are officers. Out of the estimated outlay on OROP of Rs 8400 crores about Rs 6200 Crores will be on account of Widows, JCOs, NCOs, and other ranks, and about 2200 for Officers.

Subhash Bhamre, Minister of State for Defence, in November 2016, informed the Rajya Sabha that there are 20,63,529 pensioner beneficiaries of OROP, of whom 1429 have submitted complaints regarding OROP benefits.

Defence pensions

Expenditure on Defense pensions, especially expenditure on pensions for the armed forces, as a result of the protracted OROP protest, gained salience. The government in order to counter the demands for OROP often cited increasing expenditure on armed forces pensions. In India defence pensions, i.e., pensions paid from defence services estimate, also includes pension bill for about 400,000 defence civilians, and Ministry of Finance personnel attached to MOD. The 7CPC which looked long and hard at the armed forces pension bill, did not pay similar attention to the expenditure on account of the growing pension bill for defence civilians and the police security apparatus. There was also no mention or acknowledgment of the growing expenditure on account on the grant of OROP, and NFU to the senior most officers, including those paid from the defense services estimate. In 2015–16 Defence pension bill was  54,500 crores of which about 36 percent was on account of defence civilians. According to Brig Deepak Sinha, a respected commentator on military affairs, "civilian pensions, despite catering to one-fifth the number of military pensioners, utilizes approximately 36 percent of defence pensions, and given our difficulties in ensuring employment, even populism suggests it is better to reduce civilians who cost five times more than to reduce the military".

Chronology

2014
17 February 2014

Finance Minister in the interim budget speech on 17 Feb 14 announces that Government has accepted the 'principle' of OROP for Defense Forces. The demand note was however never raised by the Ministry Of Defence.

26 February 14

Government  issue Order to  Implementation OROP.

27 February 2014

A K Antony, Defence Minister  says that UPA will implement OROP by 1 April 2014.

24 April 2014

A K Antony constitutes a Joint Working Group (JWG), with  CGDA, as chairperson (later promoted to Secretary & Financial Adviser in the MoD). Members include representatives from Department of Ex-Servicemen Welfare, Defence/Finance, and Service HQ (Chairmen of the Army, Navy and Air Force Pay Commission Cells and a few officers). The first meeting of the JWG was convened on 2 May 2014 in the office of the CGDA.

9 June 2014

The President in a Statement to the joint session of parliament says Government has drafted National Commission for Ex-Servicemen Bill, 2015 in order to set up the National Commission for Ex-Servicemen. However, no funds have been allocated for setting up of the commission during the year 2014–15.

10 July 2014

Arun Jaitley, Finance Minister and Defence Minister, in his maiden Budget Speech in the parliament, says, "We reaffirm our commitment to our brave soldiers. A policy of 'One Rank One Pension' has been adopted by the Government to address the pension disparities. We propose to set aside a further sum of  1,000 crore to meet this year's requirement"

14 August 2014

Maj Gen (Retd) Satbir Singh, SM, Chairman IESM, writes to Narendra Modi, Prime Minister, in response to his statement in Leh on 12 Aug 2014 stating that budget caters for the demand of OROP. The letter says the statement is "erroneous", and not in sync with Draft Govt Letter (DGL) prepared by Service HQs in the meetings in Feb and March, 2014, in which the forecast for OROP was  5000 crore, and not  1500 crore earmarked in the budget. The letter recalls that in a meeting chaired by Mr. AK Antony, former Defence Minister on 26 Feb 2014, OROP definition was approved and OROP was to be implemented with effect from 1 Apr 2014. The letter reminds the PM that "It has been six months since the OROP was approved".

20 August 2014

Air Chief Marshal Arup Raha, Admiral Robin Dhowan and General Dalbir Singh Suhag, briefed A K Mathur, Justice (retd), the chairman 7th Central Pay Commission (CPC), on the pay and pension "anomalies" caused by the 6 CPC.

23 October 2014

Narendra Modi, on Diwali Day, during a well publicized visit to army formation in Siachen Glacier, told soldiers "It was in my destiny that One rank One pension has been fulfilled". Modi's "Mann Ki Baat", radio address on 31 May 2015, in which he asked Ex-Servicemen to remain patient, as he gets rid of the bureaucratic hassles.

 24 December 2014

Manohar Parrikar, Defence Minister, on the advice of R.K. Mathur, Defence Secretary (25.05.2013 -24.05.2015), informs Chairman of the 7CPC, that he does not favor NFU for the Armed Forces. The justification for not recommending NFU for the armed forces is that the Cabinet Secretary, in 2011, had not made "any recommendations on the issue".

2015

17 February 2015

Manohar Parrikar, Defence Minister, approves proposal for implementation of OROP, estimated to cost  8600 crores. The proposal is forwarded by the MOD, to Ministry of Finance on 17 Mar 2015, where it is still lying.

5 May 2015

Lt Gen SK Bahri, Chairman, Alliance of Ex-Servicemen Organizations, who had attended Modi's Rally at Riwari in 2013, writes to Narendra Modi, Prime Minister, to say that "ESM community is a very disillusioned lot". He reminds the PM of his promise at Riwari, and the repeated promises to implement OROP by the Defence Minister, including the COAS, since then. The letter blames the "intransigent bureaucracy" and Arun Jaitley the Finance Minister (FM) for the delay.

12 May 2015

Bidyadhar Nayak, Petty Officer Radio(Special), Indian Navy, general secretary of the Odisha unit, issues press release on behalf of Indian Ex-Services League (IESL), Odisha unit. The press release blames the bureaucracy for non-implementation of the grant of One Rank One Pension (OROP).

16 May 2015

Manohar Parrikar, in Goa, says "OROP proposal is in final stage. The defence ministry has approved it and the finance ministry will clear it in a few days, adding, "it is the first time that a clear proposal has been sent to finance ministry on OROP."

28 May 2015

Wing Commander Suresh Damodar Karnik, 80, winner of the Vir Chakra for combat action in the eastern and western theatres, in 1971 War, and former flight commander No 16 Bomber Squadron (Black Cobras), Indian Air Force (IAF), refused to meet with Manohar Parrikar, Defence Minister, and Devendra Fadnavis, Chief Minister, Maharashtra, to protest BJP's failure to honour its commitment to implement OROP. The wing commander, on 28 May 2015, in Pune, said that he and his colleagues are unable to 'accept the invite' from the present Government because of its policy of NATO or ‘NO ACTION TALK ONLY’.

4 June 2015

Lt General Vijay Oberoi, former Vice Chief of Army Staff, and widely respected war hero of the 1965 war in which he lost his right leg while serving with Maratha Light Infantry, dismissed Narendra Modi's comments on OROP as disingenuous, especially his comment that there were multiple definitions of OROP.

6 June 2015

Ex-Servicemen delegation led by Major General (Retired) Satbir Singh met Manohar Parrikar, Defence Minister. The meeting was arranged on the initiative of General Dalbir Singh Suhag, Chief of Army Staff. The meeting was inconclusive, and the two sides agreed to meet again.

11 June 2015

Brig (Retired) Harwant Singh, state convener of the Indian Ex-Servicemen Movement (IESM), announces that about 5,000 ex-servicemen from Punjab, which has about 6,00,000 Ex-servicemen, are planning to go to Delhi to participate in the protest rally on grant of OROP scheduled to begin 14 June. The participants, which will include around 200 hunger strikers, will be given a "ceremonial farewell" at the war memorial in Jalandhar by war widows. Brig KS Kahlon (retd), President, chapter of the All India Defence Brotherhood, said the protest will also include return of war medals to the President by some ex-servicemen.

14–15 June 2015

Veteran hold "Maha Sangram Rally" at Jantar Mantar, New Delhi, and 50 other locations nationwide. 15 June, commence relay hunger strike.–

15 Jun 2015

On 15 Jun 2015 several hundred of ex-servicemen, widows and Veer Narees of All Assam Ex-servicemen Welfare Association (South Zone) Patharkandi, Assam held a rally  under  Ex Sub Maj Nirmal Sinha, President of the Association with 12 hours hunger strike. The rally was started from AMAR JAWAN & WAR MEMORIAL point (Constructed by ExSub Maj Nirmal Sinha (Sigs)), marched through the town along the NH 8.   It attracted the attention of shopkeepers, house owners, mazdoors and passengers of bus, rail etc. Many people loved to hear the patriotic songs sung by the veterans in the midst of demand. A memorandum to His Excellency The President of India was sent through JR Lal Seim the Circular Officer of Patharkandi requesting immediate implementation of OROP. The crowd supported Maj Gen (Retd) Satbir Singh for his ceaseless effort on the issue and thanked other associated Officers, JCOs and ORs for their valuable contribution and sacrifice.
 
On 15 June, several hundred ex-servicemen, staged a dharna, at Lower PMG Square, Bhubaneshwar, Odisa. Bidyadhar Nayak, general secretary, Indian Ex-Services League(IESL), Odisa unit, referring to the PM's statement that OROP was complex issue said, "Does this imply that OROP has got entangled in bureaucratic malaise for another four years? We have every reason to believe that the Prime Minister is being fed with falsities by sections who are against OROP and lobbies are working hard against the armed forces personnel." IESL officials Group Captain Jagadananda Brahma, President IESL, Arun Mohanty, and Bidyadhar Nayak submitted a memorandum on implementation of OROP to Governor SC Jamir

22 June 2015

Ex-servicemen announce intent to boycott golden jubilee events to mark the 1965 war with Pakistan, including "felicitation of 1965 War Veterans" to be hosted by President Pranab Mukherjee at the Rashtrapati Bhavan in September. Ex-Servicemen also announce intent to boycott all government functions including at-home by president on Independence day (August 15), and the Ex-Servicemen contingent at the Republic Day Parade on 26 January 2016. Brigadier Harwant Singh, Regiment of Artillery, veteran of the battle of Chhamb-Akhnoor, 1965 war, says "We don't wish to be treated as showpieces, to be rolled out for ceremonies and discarded thereafter."

25 June 2015

Mizoram Ex-Service League, which has membership of 6,200 ex-servicemen [and about 25000 dependents], held protest rally, in Aizawl, demanding implementation of OROP.

27 June 2015

Maj Gen Satbir Singh, SM (Retd), Chairman IESM, on the 13th Day of the Relay Hunger Strike, issued a circular, claiming that hunger strike protest have spread to 50 locations, all over the country.

28 June 2015

500 veterans, demanding implementation of OROP, protest in Chennai, at Kamarajapuram Bus Stop, near Tambaram.

1 July 2015

United Front of Ex-servicemen, an ex-service organisation, revealed that ex-service men are reconsidering their protest tactics: new tactics will include continuation of relay hunger strike; protests outside homes of parliamentarians; mobilising electoral support against BJP in state election; and submitting letter and petitions to the President signed by war widows in their blood. In the meanwhile eight farmers organisations have joined the ex-servicemen protest under the banner 'Jai Jawan Jai Kisan'. A 1965 war veteran from Rajasthan, Krishan Kumar, in Delhi said, "We will stop fighting only when implementation of OROP takes place."

2 July 2015

On 19th day of nationwide hunger protest by ex-servicemen on 'One Rank One Pension' (OROP), Manohar Parrikar, Defence Minister, with General Dalbir Singh Suhag, Army Chief of Staff, by his side, met a six-member delegation of United Front of Ex-Servicemen (UFESM). Next meeting between the Defence, Minister and the Ex-Servicemen representatives is likely on 6 or 7 July.

7 July 2015

Brig Inder Mohan Singh (Retd), President, Indian Ex-Services League (IESL), Punjab, announced plan to hold protest rally by ex-servicemen on 8 July on a 3-km stretch on the Barnala-Bathinda Highway, from Sub-Area HQ gate to the headquarters X Corps gate. Large number of Junior Commissioned Officers and non-commissioned officers, including many veterans of 1965 war, are expected to participate in the protest. General Officer Commanding, Bathinda, Sub-Area, to the great disappointment of the protesting ex-servicemen, declined request to provide drinking water thinking it was illegal and fearing that "an explanation could be sought for this act." Brig Inder Mohan Singh, disappointed, asked, "Is serving water and that too to veterans not a humanitarian gesture?". Protest placards read "Soldiers become veterans, veterans become beggars. This is Make in India"; "Once a soldier, now a humiliated veteran"; "In no other country veterans protest as in India"; and "Indian soldiers' enemies- some across borders some in Delhi". Bhatinda type protest on OROP, according to Brig (Retired) Inder Mohan Singh, will be also conducted in front of other military stations. There are 14 Army stations and 5 Air Force stations in Punjab.

Justice T S Thakur, Supreme Court Judge, in a hearing on contempt petition by retired Major General S P S Vains, gave Additional Solicitor General Pinky Anand, six more weeks to implement OROP. The next hearing is on 24 August.
The Supreme Court Judgment on 9 September 2008 in the case of Union of India and Maj Gen Vains and Others had ruled: (a) No Defence Personnel Senior in rank can get lesser pension than his junior irrespective of the date of retirement (b) Similarly placed Officers of the same rank are to be given the same pension irrespective of the date of retirement.

8 July 2015

Ex-Servicemen protesting against Government failure to implement OROP blocked traffic on Bathinda-Chandigarh highway from 10 am to 1 pm, and sat in dharna in front of the police post in Bhatinda cantonment. Brigadier Inder Mohan Singh (retired), IESL, submitted a petition to a representative of headquarter X Corps (Chetak Corps) South Western Command. Brigadier Inder Mohan Singh indicated that the next protest will be in Amritsar, in which Captain Amarinder Singh former Punjab chief minister and Congress deputy leader in the Lok Sabha, is likely to participate.

The police arrested six ex-servicemen and charged them under Indian Penal Code sections 283 (danger or obstruction in public way or line of navigation) and 188 (disobedience to order duly promulgated by public servant). The arrested include: Bhinder Singh, Ramji Das and Sukhdev Singh, from Sangrur; Baldev Singh from Tarn Taran; and Kartar Singh, and Baldev Raj Joshi, from Bathinda. The police also registered cases against over 150 others who have not been named.

10 July 2015

Bhagat Singh Koshyari, the sitting BJP MP from Nainital-Udhamsingh Nagar, claimed that the Koshyari committee Report on OROP, 2011, prepared by the panel headed by him, was fool-proof. He blamed the United Progressive Alliance government headed by Manmohan Singh, PM, for not implementing OROP.

11 July 2015

Five retired Lieutenant Generals, four Major Generals and one Air Marshall of the Indian Air Force, joined the protest at jantar mantar, in New Delhi. Many of these general officers belong to the famous June 1971 Indian Military Academy (IMA) course, the "Born to battle" course, that was sent into the 1971 war as Second Lieutenants (2/Lt). One of the 2/Lt from 'born to battle course' who went to war in 1971 was Arun Khetrapal, troop leader, Poona Horse, who was awarded posthoumously the Param Vir Chakra, the nations highest award for valour in the famous tank battle of Basantar. Another 2/Lt from the 'born to battle' course, who joined the protest was Lieutenant General (Retired) Rajinder Singh Sujlana AVSM, VSM, former Colonel Commandant of the Sikh Regiment, and X Corps Commander.

13 July 2015

Punjab based ex-servicemen organisations, including All India Defence Brotherhood (A constituent of the United front of Ex-Servicemen(UFESM)), State Ex-Servicemen Welfare Association (SEWA), and Ex-Servicemen's Joint Action Front (Sanjha Morcha) held a protest rally at the Dussera ground Mohali. Ex-servicemen participants in the large rally included Lt Gen SR Ghosh, former GOC-in-C, Western Command, Lt Gen RS Sujlana, former Commandant Indian Military Academy and GOC X Corps, and Major Generals Dhillon, DP Singh, IP Singh and Amarjit Singh. The participants unanimously resolved to boycott functions during the visit of Defence Minister on 25 July to inaugurate ‘Mai Bhago Institute’ for training of girls to join the Defence Service. Brig Harwant Singh (Retd), President (UFESM), issued a Press Statement which stated that government inaction will force the ex-servicemen to resort to Direct Action.

17 July 2015

Defence Minister has set up a five-member committee consisting Lt Gen Richard Khare, (Retd), former Military Secretary; Lt Gen Mukesh Sabharwal,(Retd), former Adjutant General; Major Navdeep Singh, Territorial Army, Chandigarh-based High Court lawyer, and commentator of service conditions; and Major DP Singh, Kargil war wounded. The committee will look into Armed Forces grievances relating to service matters and pensions. The committee is expected submit its findings and recommendations within 60 days. No official announcement on the committee has been made by MOD, or the Defence Minister's office, but media reports suggests that the term of reference of the committee include making recommendations on measures to reduce litigation by Armed Forces members and Ex-servicemen, including the MOD which is a frequent litigator. There are over 10,000 cases by military personnel before the Armed Forces Tribunal, the High Courts and the Supreme Court, most of them against the Ministry of Defence, or prompted by its decisions, on service matters relating to pay fixation, promotions, policy interpretation, pensions and military justice.

21 July 2015

UFESM issued notices inviting veterans, veteran organization, and 'citizens of India', to participate in a "Kargil vijay divas run on 26 July". The run to unite veterans on OROP will be flagged off from DSOI, Dhaula Kuan, at 0500 hrs. It will pass through Teen Murti-Akbar Road-Janpath-Rajpath-India Gate-Kharg Singh Marg-Rajeev Chowk. It will end at Jantar Mantar, the site where ex-servicemen are fasting in protest against BJP Government failure to address their grievances. After the run, the runners will assemble at India Gate at 0800 am to pay homage to Kargil war martyrs, "who gave ultimate sacrifice to ensure that you sleep well". The ceremony at India gate will include laying wreath at Amar Jawan Jyoti.

24 July 2015

On the 40th day of the Relay Hunger Strike at Jantar Mantar, New Delhi, and protest in other locations in the country, Maj Gen Satbir Singh, SM (Retd), Advisor United Front of Ex-Servicemen and Chairman IESM, in written message to veterans said "we have upgraded our Agitation with effect from mid night 23 Jul 2015". The agitation in the new phase, he said, will be "peaceful and within the authorised methods of protests in the Constitution. The aim will be to raise awareness on One Rank One Pension (OROP) and related issues, and 'Create Visibility' in all the Districts in the County". The planned measures include: 10 Kilometre Kargil Vijay Diwas Marathon from DSOI, Dhaula Kuan, to India gate and Jantar Mantar, Delhi; participation of Anna Hazare in the protest on 26 July; raising public awareness on OROP and related issues using of placards, billboards, leaflets, briefing print and electronic media, and organising marathon runs and rallies across the country. Protest will also be registered by urging ex-servicemen to boycotted government functions, displaying black flags on houses, surrender of BJP party membership by ex-servicemen, and sending petitions. Other measures may include sending bangles to the PM by "Veer Naaries (brave ladies) of Jhajjar district"; dharana outside the residences of MP, who fail to follow up on OROP in the Parliament; possible hunger strike till death; and submission of Memorandum to Narendra Modi, Prime Minister, by delegation of United Front of Ex-servicemen at 1 pm on 26 Jul 2015. In the meanwhile Jantar Mantar, New Delhi, continues to attract ex servicemen of all ranks. On 24 July, Maj General Satbir reported that officers from the 1st National Defence Academy (NDA) course, who are in their 80s, visited Jantar Mantar, Delhi, to show solidarity with the relay hunger strikers and express disapproval of government policy.

26 July 2015

To coincide with Vijay Diwas (Victory Day) events to mark the Kargil War, UK based Non Resident Indians (NRIs) held a one-day hunger strike to protest BJP Government failure to implement One rank One pension (OROP), outside the High Commission of India, London. A spokesperson for the protesters said similar protest are planned in other international cities, including in the US and Middle East.

31 July 2015

Admiral Ram Das Former Chief of Naval Staff visited Jantar Mantar to meet with and show solidarity with the Ex-servicemen and widows of veterans on hunger strike protesting the BJP Government failure to implement OROP and honour its election pledge. Admiral Ram Das made a donation to the ex-servicemen movement and said that he would write to all former Chiefs of the Army, Navy, and Airforce to overcome their inhibitions and visit Jantar mantar to show solidarity with the protesting ex-servicemen.

11 August

Gen V P Malik meet Nripendra Misra in the Prime Minister Office (PMO) where he was briefed by Mishra, and a joint secretary (JS) dealing with OROP in PMO, on the governments stand. In the evening the JS in the PMO briefs Malik, Gen Satbir Singh of the Indian Ex-Servicemen Movement (IESM) and General Balbir Singh of the Indian Ex-Servicemen League (IESL).

12 August

General Malik meets Gen Satbir Singh of the Indian Ex-Servicemen Movement (IESM) and General Balbir Singh of the Indian Ex-Servicemen League (IESL), to discuss the 'government stand' which remains unchanged. The sticking point remains the new definition of OROP, and the date of implementation of OROP.

13 August 2015

Malik meets Misra and briefs him on his discussions with the representatives of the Indian Ex Servicemen Movement (IESM). At this meeting, according to Gen Malik, Misra gave the ‘final stand of the Govt’ after speaking with Prime Minister and Arun Jaitley, the Finance Minister. The attempt at last minute mediation to enable the PM to make the OROP announcement on Independence day broke down on the issues of the government's new definition of OROP and date of implementation of OROP.

General S F Rodrigues, former COAS, and Admirals L Ramdas, Arun Prakash and Sureesh Mehta, former Chiefs of Naval Staff, wrote an open letter to President Pranab Mukherjee, Supreme Commander of the Armed Forces. The letter was ignored, the President did not respond to the letter.

14 August 2015

Rajnath Singh, the Home Minister of India authorized Delhi Police, a police force under the Ministry of Home Affairs, to evict by force ex-servicemen, families of ex-servicemen, and war widows, from Jantar Mantar, the site of Ex servicemen protests. The Police Contingent, consisting of personnel drawn from the Delhi Police, and Central Reserve Police Force, a counterinsurgency and internal security force under the Ministry of Home Affairs, in camouflage dress, unsupervised by senior officers, without advance warning, swooped down on the protesters. The protesting Ex servicemen, many in their eighties, were manhandled, 'pushed around', dragged, humiliated, and lathi-charged. Their tents were forcibly removed, placards and other equipment damaged.

The Delhi Police officers justified action against the peaceful gathering at Jantar Mantar claiming they acted "following a request by New Delhi Municipal Council", civic agency  and because of security risk and threats. "As Delhi is on a high alert ahead of Independence Day so", a senior police officer said. " we are removing the protesters to ensure security."

The ex-servicemen were outraged by Delhi police officer's allegations that they were a security risk

The orders to Delhi police to remove the Ex servicemen, were rescinded on 14 August afternoon, following public outrage, and intervention by General VK Singh, on behalf of the ex-servicemen, with Rajnath Singh, the Home Minister, according to ex-servicemen. The Home Minister's orders to stop the police action against the ex-servicemen was conveyed Delhi Police Commissioner BS Bassi by Kiren Rijiju, Minister of State for Home.

15 August 2015 

Prime Minister Narendra Modi  refers to "One Rank One Pension" as a problem "pending to be resolved" in his  Independence Day  address  from  Red Fort, New Delhi.

17 August 2015

Ten former Chiefs of the Armed Forces of India (7 former chief of Indian Army staff, 2 Chiefs of Air Staff, and 1 Chief of Naval Staff), in an unprecedented joint open letter urged Narendra Modi, the Prime Minister, to order an inquiry into the brutal police action by Delhi Police against the peaceful gathering of veterans in Jantar Mantar, on Independence Day eve and to resolve the OROP issue expeditious. The Signatories to the letter include retired Generals Vishwa Nath Sharma, Shankar Roy Choudhary, Sundararajan Padmanabhan, Joginder Jaswant Singh, Deepak Kapoor and Bikram Singh; retired Air Chief Marshals Nirmal Chandra Suri and Shashindra Pal Tyagi, and retired Admiral Madhvendera Singh.
Colonel (Retd) Pushpender Singh (ex-3 Grenadiers) and Havaldar (Retd) Major Singh (Ex-3 Sikh Light Infantry), began hunger strike-unto-death at Jantar Mantar. Havildar Major Singh belongs to the same Regiment as Retired General Ved Malik, former Chief of army Staff. They were joined by Havildar Ashok Chauhan, Corps of signals, on 18 August.
18 August 2015

General Dalbir Singh Suhag, Chief of Army Staff, late in the night on 17 August, called Major General Satbir Singh, and urged him to meet with Nripendra Misra, Principal Secretary to the PM, on 18 August 2015. Major General Satbir Singh and Lt General Balbir Singh, representatives of the ex servicemen, after initial hesitation, met Nripendra Misra, Principal Secretary to the PM, at 1000h on 18 August 2015, to discuss resolution of the OROP. This was first overture from the government to the Ex servicemen since the protest started in June 2015. Mr Misra urged the Ex Servicemen representatives to end the protest. The ex-servicemen representatives informed Mr Misra that ex servicemen will end their protest only after the Government gives an assurance that it will not alter the accepted definition of OROP, implement OROP for all pensioners with effect from 1 April 2014, and ensure that all future enhancements will be automatically passed on to past pensioners. Mr Misra failed to give an assurance on the issues raised by the Ex servicemen. During the meeting Mr Misra was reminded of BJP's commitment, made in its manifesto, to build a martyrs memorial and set up veterans’ commission, to be manned by veterans. Mr Misra seemed unaware of these commitments by the BJP. In the presence of the ex-servicemen representatives, Mr Misra called the Defense Secretary and asked him to brief him on these subjects.

21 August 2015

Vijay Singh, (IPS- 2005), Deputy Commissioner Police,(DCP)-1 New Delhi, who led the police contingent to evict Armed Forces veterans from the Jantar Mantar transferred as Deputy Commissioner of Police(DCP) North West District. Delhi Police PRO Rajan Bhagat calls it routine transfer, and denies media reports that this was because of police action against veterans on 14 August 2015.

22 August 2015

Rallies by Ex servicemen in support of the OROP movement were held Udham Singhn Nagar, Mohali, and Mysore.

23 August 2015

On 70 day of the Relay Hunger Strike (RHS), called Satyagraha by some ex-servicemen, 25 Ex-servicemen, from 14 Indian States, were on RHS at Jantar Mantar. The fast unto death by Col Pushpender Singh(Grenadiers), and Havaldar Major Singh (Sikh Light Infantry) entered the eighth day, and by Hav Ashok Kumar Chauhan (Signals) the sixth day.

United Front of Ex-Servicemen (UFESM) organized a candle light march, and vigil, to honor, and remember, armed forces members killed in the 1965 war. Over 4000 ex-servicemen, and civilians, participated in the event. Participants lit candles, and laid bouquets at Amar Jawan Jyoti, at India Gate. "Sainik parliament" had passed a resolution to boycott all government functions, including by the armed forces, till implementation of OROP.

Veterans and their wives, including and war widows, protested police action on 14 August, against the veterans in Delhi, and delay in implementing OROP, in Dehradun, the State capital of Uttarakhand. Participants included Lt Gen TPS Rawat, (4 Gorkha Rifles), a former minister, Lt General Gambhir Singh Negi (former Colonel of 3 Gorkha Rifles), Maj Gen Lalji D Singh (Corps of Engineers, Bombay Sappers), Maj Gen Chander Nandwani, Brig KG Behl, Brig RS Rawat, Brig Vijay Kumar, Col PL Prashar, Col GS Cheema Col AK Khullar, Brig CB Thapa, Col SC Tyagi, Maj SS Chowdhury, and Col Kukreti, first JSW course 

A joint Kisan rally- ex-servicemen was held at Satara. the rally was attended amongst others by Anna Hazare. An estimated 10,000 people attended the rally.

Large number of ex-servicemen, and civilian supporters, visited Jantar Mantar, to show solidarity with ESM cause. These included: officers from Short Service Courses (SS) 2, and 31; National Defence Academy (NDA) course 46 and 75; 55 and 85 Indian Military Academy; and officers from the 14 Army Education Course; and twenty five officers and their families came from Jaipur. The movement continues to gain momentum, and perceptible increase in support and participation by former high-ranking officers of the armed forces, from Lt generals, Admirals, air marshals, Group Captains, and Colonels. Old veterans included Sep Ram Kishan, 93 years, Armoured Corp veteran of World War II; Sep Ram Bharose Yadav, 85 years, a blind veteran of 72 Medium Artillery; and Mrs Savita Rai Singh wife of Brig Rai Singh(90 Year old) Maha Vir Chakra. Many visitor contributed substantial sums to the cause.

24 August 2015

Colonel Pushpendra Singh, one of three veterans on hunger strike at Jantar Mantar, was evacuated to Army Research and Referral Hospital, Delhi, in a private car, due to deteriorating condition.

25 August 2015

On 72 day of the Relay Hunger Strike (RHS), 37 Ex-servicemen were on RHS at Jantar Mantar. Col Pushpender Singh(Grenadiers), was in the Intensive Care Unit (ICU), Army Research and Referral Hospital ( R&R), Havaldar ( Hav) Major Singh (Sikh Light Infantry), on 10th day of his fast unto death refused to be evacuated; and Hav Ashok Kumar Chauhan (Signals) on the 8th day, was vacuated to R&R due to muscle atrophy. The other hunger strikers, who were all fit, were: Major Piar Chand, 2 Grenadiers; Hav Sahib Singh, 2 Rajputana Rifles; and Naik Uday Singh Rawat of 12 Garhwal Rifles.

Visitors included Rajeev Chandrasekhar Indep MP Rajya Sabha; and Ms Nalini Singh, Journalist. The meals for the day were provided by Gurdwara Bangla Sahib, and Col Gurdeep Singh.

General Satbir Singh met Ajit Doval, National Security Adviser and Former head of Intelligence Bureau. This is the first report of NSA's interest and concern in OROP. The outcome of this meeting and issues discussed is not known. According to Media reports Doval is expected to take an "overall view of the situation" and be involved in the "final negotiations".

26 August 2015

Major General Satbir Singh (Retd), head of the Indian Ex-Servicemen Movement, met Nripendra Misra, Principal Secretary to PM. General Dalbir Singh, COAS, was present at the meeting.

27 August 2015

Capt Amarinder Singh, Congress MP and former Punjab chief minister, a 1965 war veteran, declared his support for OROP.

On 74 day of the Relay Hunger Strike (RHS), at Jantar Mantar, 39 Ex-servicemen and four war widows (Veer Narees) were on RHS. In Ambala and Pathankot, RHS entered the 70th day and 74th day respectively.

There were 8 person on indefinite fast, 4 at Janatr Mantar, and 4 in Research and Referrals Army Hospital (RR): Col Pushpender Singh(Grenadiers), in RR, twelfth day. Hav Ashok Kumar Chauhan(Signals), in RR, 10th day. Major Piar Chand and Hav Sahib Singh were evacuated to Research and Referrals on advice of the doctors.

Havildar Major Singh (Sikh Light Infantry), at Jantar Mantar, on the 12th day of his fast was joined by his brother. In addition there are four more soldiers, and a father of a martyred soldier Sunil Kumar Yadav, on indefinite fast, at Jantar Mantar.

Visitors to Jantar Mantar included: Mrs. Charu Sheela(95 yrs) mother of Col. Pushpender; representative of Rashtra Sewak Trust; Air Marshal J S Bawa and Lt Gen Suri; and Officers from 10th NDA and 19th IMA courses. Breakfast and Lunch was provided by SSC NT-27 & Technical-18 and Gurudwara Bangla Sahib.

28 August 2015

Ex Servicemen representatives including Major General (retd) Satbir Singh, Chairman of the Indian Ex-Servicemen Movement, and Group Captain VK Gandhi, meet Rajnath Singh, Home Minister, in his office in the Ministry of Home Affairs, in Delhi, at his invitation. This is the first meeting between officials of the MHA and ex servicemen since 14 August Police action against ex servicemen in Jantar Mantar.

Pranab Mukherjee, President of India, lays wreath at the Amar Jawan Jyoti, at India Gate. Military veterans boycott official function at India Gate to mark the start of month-long golden jubilee celebrations of the 1965 war.

A "parallel commemoration" of 1965 war coinciding with the capture of Hajipir Pass by Major Ranjit Singh Dyal, MVC, 1 Parachute Regiment, is attended by several veterans of the 1965 war, including Brigadier (retd) D P Nayar, a veteran of the attack on Hajipir, and Wing Commander (retd) Vinod Nebb. Wing Commander Vinod Nebb who was 22, in 1965, on 6 September, on an alert from air defense commander, Ambala, while on a combat air patrol sortie over Ludhiana, Punjab, brought down a Pakistani Sabre jet fighter for which he was awarded Vir Chakra, India's third highest gallantry award.
The Times of India, in an editorial comment wrote that Ex Servicemen demands of OROP are "not a sustainable proposition" and taxpayer money "will be recklessly splurged if the demand is accepted."

31 August 2015

On 78 day of the Relay Hunger Strike (RHS), Havildar Major Singh (Sikh Light Infantry), who is on fast since 16 August, is joined by Naik Udai Singh Rawat, Sawal Ram Yadav, father of martyr Lance Naik Sunil Kumar Yadav, navy Commander A.K. Sharma, Subedar Vijay Singh Yadav and Subedar Keshaw Singh.

Ram Jethmalani, former BJP member, visits Jantar Mantar, declares support for OROP, and blames the finance minister for delay in implementing OROP.

1 September 2015

On 79th day of the Relay Hunger Strike (RHS), there were 28 Ex-servicemen, and wives of three Ex servicemen on Relay Hunger Strike at Jantar Mantar. In Ambala and Pathankot, the RHS entered the 75th and 79th day respectively. There were 4 ex servicemen on hunger strike in the army Hospital, and 8 at Jantar Mantar. Hav Major Singh, who has been on fast since 16 August, has lost 10 kilo of weight. He continues to refuses to end his 17 days old fast, take medicines, or be evacuated to hospital.

3 September 2015

Leaks by Government sources to media suggest that it may unilaterally announce implementation of One Rank One Pension in next 2 to 3 days. Ex servicemen Representative Maj General Satbir Singh while acknowledging that he had met with Nripendra Misra, Principal Secretary to PM, made clear there were no on going negotiations with the government. Nothing had been agreed to so far. Referring to questions raised on the financial implication of OROP he said that when the government sanctioned Non Functional Upgrades to the All India Services after the 6th Pay Commission  no question on the financial implications were raised.
Shekhar Gupta, calling ex servicemen protest unedifying spectacle on a popular English language TV news channel, argued that ex-servicemen should accept what is offered.

5 September 2015

Government unilaterally announces the implementation the 'OROP Scheme' for the Armed Forces.

17 October 2015

Rajyavardhan Singh Rathore, former colonel, MP from Rajasthan, and Minister of State for Information and Broadcasting in the BJP Government, in an interview to a TV news-channel, denounced the Ex servicemen for continuing with their protest.

7 November 2015

Department of Ex-Servicemen Welfare, Ministry of Defence, as follow up to the 5 September announcement, issues order on "One Rank One Pension (OROP) to the Defence Forces Personnel", which were delayed on account of the elections in Bihar.

The OROP order excludes all future Armed Forces retirees who take premature retirement from OROP entitlement.

9 November 2015

The ex servicemen announce that they will start returning their medals on 10–11 November, across the country, to District Magistrates, who have been informed to collect the medals, Group Captain VK Gandhi (retd), the general secretary of Indian Ex-servicemen Movement (IESM), said. In Delhi, the medals will be returned outside Terminal 1 of the Indira Gandhi International Airport (IGIA). The protesting ex-servicemen also met Delhi Chief Minister Arvind Kejriwal to brief him about the government notification on OROP. Kejriwal informed Group Captain VK Gandhi (retd).

10 November 2015

Manohar Parrikar, denounces Ex-servicemen decision to return medals; and calls protesting ex-servicemen emotional, and disgruntled.

11 November 2015

Military veterans, on Diwali, which the veterans call a ‘Black Diwali’, took out a protest march to Rashtrapati Bhavan, to meet with the President. The marchers were intercepted by Delhi Police near Rail Bhavan.

13 November 2015

Arvind Kejriwal, Delhi Chief Minister, visited ex-servicemen protesting at Jantar Mantar. He urged the government "to immediately accept the demands of the veterans".

16 November 2015

Brig Harwant Singh (retd), representative of United Front of Ex-servicemen, says the OROP movement is not about money, but about self-respect and izzat.

19 November 2015

7th Pay Commission, headed by Justice A K Mathur, in its 900-page report, recommends OROP, without calling it one-rank-one-pension (OROP), for all central government employees, including para-military personnel as well defence civilians who have retired before 1 January 2016. The recommendations affect 47 lakh central government employees and 52 lakh pensioners:increase in pay will be 16 per cent, allowances 63 per cent and pension 24 per cent.

Seventh Central Pay Commission (7CPC), in its consideration of one rank one pay, notes that France, China, and Germany have pension schemes for the armed forces, much like India. The US and UK, with a small variation, have a similar scheme, called a "defined benefit scheme".

On the contentious issue of Non - Functional Upgradation, there was disagreement between the chairman of 7CPC and the members of the commission. Chairman "felt that NFU should be allowed to continue since it has existed for the last 10 years and is being availed by all the Organised Group ‘A’ Services", and that it "should be extended to the officers of the Defence forces and CAPFs". Vivek Rae, IAS, and Dr. Rathin Roy, Members, Seventh CPC, disagreed. They felt that NFU till SAG and HAG level, granted to Organised Group ‘A’ Services, should be withdrawn, and did not support extension of "NFU to Defence Forces and CAPFs, including ICG".

2 December 2015

General (Retd) VK Singh, former Chief of army Staff and Union Minister, who has been involved in Government's 'back-channel' overtures with veterans, according to Ex-servicemen sources, who had met Manohar Parrikar, Defence Minister, on 2 December, will mediate between government and protesting ex-servicemen, on 'One Rank One Pension' scheme. In the meanwhile the veterans continue to examine the option of seeking legal redress in the supreme court, and prepare for the rally scheduled for on 13 December.

4 December 2015

Rao Inderjit Singh, by Minister of State for Defence, confirmed that Government will appoint a "Judicial Committee to look into anomalies" including issues concerning "methodology for fixation of pension, periodicity of its revision, coverage of future PMR cases" raised by veterans.

Deepender Hooda, Congress MP, criticizing BJP Government failure to implement full OROP, says, Congress supports the demands of the veterans, including annual review of OROP instead of 5 year review as notified by the BJP Government; and OROP for those who take premature retirement. The Congress Party, he said, will take the OROP issue forward in parliament by seeking funds for the implementation of OROP.

7 December 2015

United Front of Ex-Servicemen (UFESM), suggests Justice R M Lodha name for chair of the one-man judicial commission to look into the concerns of the veterans.

14 December 2015

Department of Ex Servicemen issues notification on appointment of Justice L. Narasimha Reddy, former Chief Justice of the Patna High Court, as the one-man judicial commission to look into the implementation of the one rank one pension scheme. The terms of reference for the committee include measures for the removal of anomalies that may arise in the implementation of the OROP as notified by the government on 7 November 2015; measures for the removal of anomalies that may arise out of inter-services issues of the three forces due to its implementation; and implications on service matters.

16 December 2015

UFESM, to mark victory on the Indian Armed Forces in the 1971 war, and pay Homage to 'Martyrs of Independent India', held a flag raising ceremony at India Gate. The event was attended by large number of veterans. Wreaths were laid by several veterans, at Amar Jawan Jyoti, including Lt Col Inderjit Singh, Chairman All India Ex-Services Welfare Association, Maj Gen Satbir Singh, SM, Vice Chairman IESM, and Col Anil Kaul VrC. After the event UFESM issued a press release in which it deplored the delay in establishing a war memorial, the failure of the government to commemorate the victory in the 1971 War, and that of all the civilians gathered at India gate none new of the historic significance of 16 December or the 1971 war. To commemorate the historic victory, and the martyrs who scarified their lives, UFESM urged the government to declare 16 December a national holiday.

23 December 2015

General Dalbir Suhag, Chief of the Army Staff (COAS); Admiral Robin Dhowan, Chief of the Naval Staff (CNS); and Air Chief Marshal Arup Raha, Chief of the Air Staff (CAS), in a joint memorandum to the Manohar Parrikar, defence minister, have urged the defence Minister to appoint an expert committee, with members from the armed forces, to examine and reconcile the pay, pension, allowances, and status anomalies exacerbated by 7CPC report, which had no representation from the armed Forces.

The Pay Commission report after it is submitted to the Government is processed by a group of bureaucrats, called a 'Committee of secretaries', which routinely endorses the report, as it did after 3, 4, 5 and 6 CPC. This process has not worked well in the past, primarily because of the conflict of interest, as the " Committee of secretaries" are direct beneficiaries from their examination and recommendation on the implementation of the pay commission reports. For instance, after the 6CPC, the 'committee of secretaries' endorsed and recommended OROP for themselves, and reward all civil servants with of Non Functional Upgrade (NFU), but strongly objected to these benefits being extended to the armed Forces. Similarly the reduction in Pensions of the Armed Forces, after the 3CPC, and imposition of 'rank pay', after 4 CPC, according armed forces generals, depressed military pay, pension, and status, especially so relative to the Indian Police Service. The memorandum by the three service chiefs seeking military representation in the review committee when viewed against this background is not as provocative as the Indian express has sought to make it out.

2016

15 January 2016

Veterans participating in an Army Day event in Dehradun reiterated their demands for implementation of full and agreed to "one rank, one post" (OROP). "It is sad for everyone that even now when Parliament has approved OROP, some unnecessary spokes have been put in its implementation," said Brig (retd) K G Behl, president of Dehradun Ex-servicemen League.

17 January 2016

About 200 veterans including Major General Satbir Singh, protested outside 2, Krishna Menon, Marg, New Delhi, the official residence of Finance Minister Arun Jaitley. The protesters highlight Jaitley's failure to take heed of their concerns, and breaking his promise given to them on 3 January that he would speak with Manohar Parrikar, Defence Minister, and 'get back' within a week on status of OROP issues that need to be resolved. Group Captain (retd) VK Gandhi. The protest ended late in the evening, after a meeting with Jayant Sinha, Minister of State for Finance. Disappointed veterans returned to Jantar Mantar, where they have been protesting since 14 June 2015.

18 January 2016

Jayant Sinha, Minister of State for Finance, met veterans briefly. Sinha, according to Col. Anil Kaul (retd), a spokesperson for the Indian Ex-Servicemen's Movement, will meet with Ex servicemen again on 20 January.

21 January 2016

As follow up on the meeting with Jayant Sinha, Minister of State for Finance, on 16 January, and on his prompting, Lt Gen Balbir Singh, President IESL, Lt Col Inderjit Singh, Chairman AIEWA and Maj Gen Satbir Singh, Chairman IESM & Adviser UFESM (JM), send a joint letter, to ' people who matter' urging them to address the anomalies in 7 November 15 notification on implementation of OROP. The letter titled 'Urgent Need to Rectify Anomalies in OROP in Govt notification dated 7 Nov 15", which has the 'approval of 200 veteran organization', is addressed to Manohar Parrikar, Raksha Mantri, Mr Arun Jaitley, Finance Minister, Jayant Sinha, Minister of State, Finance, General Dalbir Singh, Chief of Army Staff, Air Chief Marshal Arup Raha, Chief of the Air Staff & Chairman Chiefs of Staffs Committee (CoSC), and Admiral RK Dhowan, Chief of Naval Staff.

26 January 2016

This year in the Republic Day March Past in Delhi, in a break from a venerable tradition, the Ministry of Defence, the organizers of the event, decided to exclude the veterans contingent from the march past. The decision to exclude the veterans from the march past and replace it with a tacky tableau advertising implementation of OROP was, it would appear, made by Manohar Parrikar, the Defense Minister, and Defence Ministry Officials including the G.Mohan Kumar, Defence secretary, and Prabhu Dayal Meena, Secretary Department of Ex-Serviceman Welfare(DESW).

3 February 2016

A Ministry of Defence press release claimed that it has fulfilled OROP, a 'demand of the Defence Forces personnel' that had been pending for '42 years'. The detailed letter on the implementation of OROP, including table for calculation of pension was issued by Department of Ex Servicemen.

4 February 2016

Colonel Anil Kaul (Retd), spokesperson for the Indian Ex servicemen, denounced the BJP Governments claims on OROP implementation, saying "OROP tables short-change widows, reservists, battle casualties, havildars, subedars and subedar majors. The Jantar Mantar protest will continue and legal options will be exercised".

Former Army Chief General Ved Prakash Malik, and Secretary, Ministry of Defence, Ajay Prasad, in a panel discussion on TV, argued in favor of OROP even for those who opt to take that 'pre-mature retirement (PMR) for what ever reason, to keep the armed forces young.

2 March 2016

Expenditure on pay and allowances for 3.5 million central government employees in the budget estimates of 2016-17 has increased by 23.5 percent. The details are tabulated below. The increase is attributed to large increase in allowances because of 7CPC recommendations, including in housing allowance, which is now 24 percent of the basic pay.

10 March

On 10 March, late in the evening, a squad of five plain-clothes men from the Haryana Police, led by thick set man who posed as flower delivery man, forced their way into the house of Wing Commander Sharma,75, former IAF officer and fighter pilot, and veteran of 1965 war and 1971 War, and arrested him. The Wing Commander, a prominent leader of the OROP movement, was arrested in front of his wife and family. The plainclothesmen, according to the officer's wife offered no explanation, or reason. The BJP Government in Haryana, or YP Singhal, Director General of Haryana Police, under whose orders the police action was conducted, did not explain the reason for deploying plainclothesmen in the raid against the officer or conducting it late in the evening, under false pretense, in a menacing manner. The raid and the arrest was made following an old complaint alleging financial wrongdoing by IESM leadership by Lt Gen Raj Kadyan, formerly Rajputana Rifles, former Chairman of the IESM, considered close to the present government. The complaint also named Maj General Satbir Singh, the present head of the IESM, and Group Captain VK Gandhi, both of whom secured anticipatory bail from the Chandigarh high court.

25 March 

Maj Gen Satbir Singh,(Retd), Chairman Indian Ex-Servicemen Movement (IESM), writes to L.Narasimha Reddy, Retired Chief Justice of Patna High Court and head of the commission on OROP scheme, and the Defence Minister, on "Urgent Need to Rectify Anomalies in OROP". The letter draws attention to Government's executive order dated 26 Feb 14 for the implementation of OROP, and the notification issued on 7 November 2015.
The letter examines five salient anomalies in the OROP scheme 2015 as follows: (1) Fixation of pension as per calendar year 2013 would result in past retirees getting less pension of one increment than the soldier retiring today. This will completely destroy definition of OROP approved by two Parliaments and will also result in loss of one increment across the board for past pensioners in perpetuity. (2) Fixing pension as mean of Min and Max pension of 2013 would result in more anomalies wherein same ranks with same length of service will draw two or more different pensions thus violating the very principle of OROP. (3) OROP has been approved in budget of 2014-15 by two parliaments. As per norms of Government, all proposals approved in budget are applicable from 1st April of that FY. In the case of OROP, the Govt had issued specific orders to its applicability wef 1st April 14. Hence implementation date for OROP from 1st July will be against the Parliament approval. Changing the date would result in loss of 3 months emoluments for OROP across the board. However, if OROP implementation date is to be kept as 1st July, then the base pension should also be accepted as per the PPOs of July 2014. (4) Pension equalisation every five year will result in a senior rank soldier drawing lesser pension than a junior rank soldier for five years thus OROP definition will be violated for five years. This will also result in permanent violation of definition as fresh cases will come up every year. (5) There are numerous errors in the constitution of Tables. How this Table have been made is not known. The fact is that no senior rank defence personnel should ever draw less pension their junior persons. There are numerous instances in the Tables where in the senior rank and senior in service have been shown to draw less pension then his junior. The tables need to be worked out afresh after all anomalies have been removed. The most appropriate method to construct Tables would be to base these tables on live data. The PPOs of defence personnel who retired in 2013 would removal that a Sepoy with 15 years of service should get pension of approx Rs 7200 per month where as in the Tables, pension has been mentioned as Rs 6665/-. This does not satisfy the approved OROP definition. There are minimum such examples. Nb Subedar of ‘Y’ group has been shown to get less than X Gp Havildar this making a senior rank defence, personal gets less than junior rank. Nb Sub TA is shown getting more pension then Regular Nb Sub. The three Service HQs pay cells must be involved in making this Table afresh. These anomalies will result in lesser pensions to widows, soldiers, NCOs and JCOs than what will be due to them on approval of OROP. This will result in veterans not getting OROP as per approved definition and will create much discontent across all ranks. There is a need to have a relook at the pensions of Hon Nb Subedars, Majors and Lt Cols. a) Some Havildars are granted rank of Hon Naib Subedar in view of their exemplary service. These soldiers are not granted pension of Naib Subedar thus making the Hon rank just ceremonial. Hon Naib Subedars should get pension of a Naib Subedar rather than that of a Havildar. Similarly, this must be accepted as a principle and it should be applicable to all Hon ranks in case of NCOs and JCOs. b) Moreover no officer is retiring in Major rank now. In the past, officers were promoted to Major rank after completing 13 yrs of service whereas present officers are getting promotion of Lt Col in 13 yrs. It will be justified to grant all pensioners of the rank of Major, minimum pension of Lt Col as they cannot be compared to present retirees as officers are not retiring as Majors any more. Number of such affected officers is not more than 800 and will not cause heavy burden to Govt. c) Similarly, all pre-2004 retiree Lt Cols should get the minimum pension of full Col. Presently all officers retire in the rank of Colonel hence all Lt Col equivalents should be granted min pension of Colonels. The above anomalies/discrepancies are being brought before you for resolution please. Finance Minister in the interim budget speech on 17 Feb 14 announces that Government has accepted the 'principle' of OROP for Defence forces. This was followed by issue of Implementation order on 26 Feb 14. The demand note was however never raised by the Ministry Of Defence.

28 March

A delegation of Civil Service officers representing the "Confederation of Civil Service Associations" submitted a memorandum on "their long standing grievance of discrimination vis-a-vis certain other All-India Services" to Jitendra Singh, Union Minister of State MoS, in Prime Ministers Office (PMO), and minister in-charge of Personnel, Public Grievances, Pensions. The "Confederation of Civil Service Associations" in their memorandum, claiming "that the majority view in the 7th CPC was in favour of changing the status-quo on the issue of pay disparity" demanded "parity" with "other services". The memorandum noted that the "main cause of resentment among the non-IAS Civil Service Officers was that all the senior level posts covering majority of Departments, be it technical or administrative, are today manned by IAS Officers. The Civil service Association which includes Defence Civilian services, demanded : [a] "equitable treatment ...so that the gap between the IAS and other Services does not widen and lead to.. chaotic situation; [b] Pay- disparity be removed altogether; and [c] the "Committee of Secretaries" to examine the report of the 7th CPC, be reconstituted to "represent all different sections of stakeholders" so that it may function with "neutrality"

29 March

Parrikar, tells India Today, that "The Seventh Pay Commission are in the form of recommendations. I do not think they (recommendations) will remain. I do not consider them as finalities. I have flagged them and will flag them properly at the right level".

3 April

At Jantar Mantar, on 3 April, at a well attended gathering veterans protested against government failure to implement OROP, and address other izzat issues, including long pending anomalies in pay and pension of armed forces. Many veterans urged veterans to contest elections to have their voice properly heard. Group Captain V.K. Gandhi (retd), general secretary of the Indian Ex Servicemen Movement said, "We have given a call to ex-servicemen to contest elections to State Assemblies, Rajya Sabha and Lok Sabha. We are a six-crore vote bank and we should have our own representatives to achieve our demands". He added that if the veterans remained united, they "would be able to fill at least 25 per cent seats in each Assembly and about 30 MPs in the Lok Sabha." While denying that United Front of Ex-Servicemen Movement (UFESM) was thinking of contesting polls, he said, "If someone comes to us and if they have good credentials we will support them."

6 April

The Cabinet gave its ex-post facto approval for implementation order dated OROP order of 7 November 2015 on One Rank One Pension (OROP). The cabinet decision reiterates that "Personnel who opt to get discharged henceforth on their own request under Rule 13(3) 1(i)(b), 13(3) 1(iv) or Rule 16B of the Army Rule. 1954 or equivalent Navy or Air Force Rules will not be entitled to the benefits of OROP. ", and that "In future, the pension would be re-fixed every 5 year".

"Financial implications on account of grant of OROP including Pre-Matured Retirees (PMR) cases" according to press Information note " would be Rs. 10925.11 crore for payment of arrears and the recurring annual financial implication would be Rs. 7488.7 crore. Till 31st March, 2015. 91 lakh pensioners have been given the first instalment of OROP, which amounts to Rs. 2,861 crore. Information is being gathered for processing on priority basis, the cases of 1.15 lakh pensioners after filling in the gaps of information such as the length of service being assessed, etc."

21 April 2016

Sashi Tharoor, former Under-Secretary-General of the United Nations, and former minister in UPA Government, in an article in The quint, commenting on the policy of the government on the declining pay, pensions, and protocol status, of the armed forces, affirmed that the dignity of the Indian armed forces has been eroded by "Petty slights, ranging from deliberately downgrading the military in protocol terms, to persistent actions to lower the status and compensation of our military personnel", and that the consequences of this policy of demeaning the armed forces " will inevitably be suffered by all". Blaming the Pay Commission and Government for being "blind" to the "enduring sacrifice" of the Armed Forces, he concludes that "We have short-changed the remuneration of our armed servicemen". He found it hard to understand the reason for the Government and pay commission to equate police officers[ and defence civilians] with 12 years of service, designated as deputy inspector general (DIG) of the police, with Brigadiers, for pay and protocol. He wonders, in disbelief, "What could possibly justify such a disparity?" Commenting on disability pensions recommended by the 7 Pay Commission, he notes that whereas a JCO and their equivalents in the air-force and the navy, will be given Rs 12,000 as pension, while his civilian counterpart, for the same level of disability, will receive a pension twice that amount (Rs 27,690).

28 April 2016

Ram Jethmalani, Senior Supreme Court lawyer, while addressing armed forces veterans, on 320th day of their protest at Jantar Mantar, said, "he will lead their legal battle in the apex court" on a Pro bono basis. Major General (retd) Satbir Singh, who was present on the occasion said, "case will be filed in Supreme Court in the next 3-4 days". He added that four more cases have been filed in the armed forces tribunal, on " rulings for Jawans, war widows, arrears since 2006, payments for honorary ranks, rounding off of disability pension, and payments of reservists".

15 June 2016

The six-month tenure of the one man judicial commission on One Rank One Pension (OROP) which ended on 15 June, was given an extension of six months, by the Government. In the wake of the extension to the commission headed Justice L. Narasimha Reddy, former Chief Justice of Patna High Court, veterans Maj Gen Satbir Singh, Chairman of the Indian Ex-Servicemen Movement, Hon Lt K Pande Member and Wing Commander CK Sharma, met Manohar Parrikar, Defence Minister, to urge him to ensure that the 'four deviations in the implementation order' on OROP are addressed. Mr Parrikar, according to media reports, assured the veteran delegation that their concerns will be addressed; and that the recommendations of seventh pay commission would be applicable to all ex-servicemen 

3 August 2016

Maj. Gen. Satbir Singh (retd), Chairman of the Indian Ex-Servicemen Movement, on 3 August, wrote to Mr. Parrikar and Justice L. Narasimha Reddy, former Chief Justice of the Patna High Court, and head of the one-man judicial commission of constituted in December last year, conveying the "anguish and concern" of exservicemen on the "neglect of defence personnel" and "betrayal" by the government. He told the Hindu newspaper that the Defence Ministry did not forward representation by exservicemen to the one-man Committee despite "assurances given by Mr. Parrikar on March 14, 2016 during a meeting of representatives of ex-servicemen". Maj. Gen. Satbir Singh in the letter to the Defence Minister noted that "The mandate given to One-Man Committee is to consider those questions/issues which have been referred to it by the Defence Ministry. This is a serious breach of trust reposed in the system". The letter is in the wake of uncertainty caused by Arun Jaitley, Finance Minister, statement in Parliament that there was no "standardised definition" of OROP.

7 August 2016

General VP Malik, Former Chief of Army Staff, in a panel discussion on the 7th Pay Commission(7CPC) confirmed that 18 former heads of the Armed Forces, including himself, had written to Narendra Modi the Prime Minister, conveying their disquiet on the impact of the recommendations of the 7CPC on the Indian armed forces. Modi, Malik confirmed, ignored the letter by the 18 former heads of Armed Forces. Malik said that the PM has not replied to the letter by the Chiefs of staff and that the PM has taken the retired chiefs for granted.

General Malik said that the recommendation of 7 CPC, which amounted to 'blatant discrimination' had caused a strong sense of 'despondency' and feeling of 'resignation' in the armed forces. The decision by the Government to create two pay and promotion 'matrixes, in the wake of the 7 CPC, one for the armed forces and another, far more indulgent one, for the civil services, Police, and security bureaucracy, he said, will have several negative outcomes: it will give the civil services including the police services officers six increments in their first 13 years of service, in comparison to just one to the armed forces; the asymmetrical pay, promotion, and status 'matrix' will, he argued, aggravate the existing 'equations' and adversely impact the already fraught civil-military relations. He said he was not convinced with the reasons given by the pay commission, that the armed forces task were any less complex than that of the police or the forest department which have been favored by the BJP Government with an indulgent pay and promotion package.

12 August 2016

A committee of Jammu and Kashmir Ex Services League (JKESL) presided over by Maj Gen Goverdhan Singh Jamwal, ex-MLC, decides, in Jammu, on submitting a memorandum to Justice Reddy Commission on 19 Aug 2016 stating that OROP should be implemented without dilution, i.e., "All retirees in the same rank and with same length of service should get the same pension irrespective of the date of retirement; and the benefits of future increases should automatically pass on to all such retirees". Other who participated in the committee's deliberations were: Brig Harcharan Singh, Director Rajya Sainik Board ; Brig RL Sharma former Station Commander Jammu; Brig Anil Gupta Former Director J&K NCC; Col K S Jamwal, Jt Chairman JKESL; Col Virendra K Sahi, VrC Director War Decorated India for J&K, Col Rajinder Singh, Gen Secy; Lt Col DS Salaria Treasurer JKESL, Lt Col KS Samyal OIC Pension Cell, Lt Col MS Jamwal and Maj JS Baloria Finance Secretary JKESL.

26 October 2016

Justice L. Narasimha Reddy, retired Chief Justice of Patna High Court, submits his report on the anomalies in the implementation of OROP to the MOD.

11 November 2016

Subhash Bhamre, Minister of State for Defence, in a written reply to question by Alok Sanjar informed Lokha Sabha that Financial year 2016–17, a sum of Rs. 12456 crore has been provided for expected expenditure on account of One Rank One Pension (OROP)

and that out 20,63,529 pensioner beneficiaries, 1,27,561 Defence Pensioners/Family Pensioners are yet to get the benefits of OROP.

19 November 2016

Maj Gen (retd) Satbir Singh, while attending a workshop organised by the Uttarakhand Ex-Servicemen League in Dehradun says that BJP Government has dishonored ex servicemen by denying them OROP. He called the OROP implemented by the BJP Government "disabled OROP". Maj Gen Satbir called on ex-servicemen to participate in the elections in Uttarkhand and Punjab and " tilt the scale". Group Captain PK Gandhi (retd), another OROP leader, said "ex-servicemen were instrumental in the BJP coming to power at the Centre and they also have the power to dislodge it". Ex-servicemen rallies are planned in Uttar Pradesh, Uttarakhand and Punjab to appeal to ex servicemen to "vote for candidates who work in their favour". The workshop was attended among others by Lt Gen GS Negi (retd) and Lt Col SC Sharma (retd).

22 November 2016

Arjun Ram Meghwal, Minister of State in the Ministry of Finance, in written reply to a question in Rajya Sabha stated that Rs. 82,332.66 crore was provided in BE 2016-17 towards payment of Defence Pensions. This included an amount of Rs. 12,456 crore towards implementation of One Rank One Pension Scheme, which takes effect from 1 July 2014.

Subhash Bhamre, Minister of State for Defence, in response to question by PL Punia and Pramod Tiwari informed the Rajya Sabha that Justice L. Narasimha Reddy, retired Chief Justice of Patna High Court, who was to look into anomalies in the implementation of OROP submitted his report on 26 October 2016. This report is under examination. There are 20,63,529 pensioner beneficiaries of OROP. 1429 Ex-Servicemen have submitted complaints with regard to OROP benefits.

25 November 2016

Manohar Parrikar, Defence Minister, to a question by Dr. Satyapal Singh, in written reply informed the Lok Sabha that Ex-Servicemen are being paid enhanced pension after the implementation of One Rank One Pension (OROP) scheme. Details of the allocation and utilization of funds under OROP are as under:

Referring to Subedar Ram Kishan Grewal, retired, who committed suicide at Delhi on 1 November 2016, over the delay in getting his pension dues, the minister informed that he was drawing pension of Rs.22,608 per month. He was however entitled to revised pension under OROP of Rs.25,634 per month. The arrears amounting to Rs.53,978, he confirmed, was credited to Bank Account- Subedar Ram Kishan Grewal on 8 November 2016.

29 November 2016

Subhash Bhamre, Minister of State for Defence, in a written reply to D Raja informed the Rajya Sabha that the "United Front Movement of Ex-Servicemen is continuing their 'protest action' since 14th June 2015 for their demands on OROP." The reply says that Government has accepted the demands of Ex-Servicemen associations to implement OROP, and pay arrears starting form 1 July 2014, and provide coverage to Premature Retirees (PMR) cases up to 7 November 2015. The reply acknowledges that "Some Ex-Servicemen Associations have been demanding changes in methodology for fixation of pension, periodicity of its revision, coverage of future PMR cases".

Subhash Bhamre Minister of State for Defence, informed in the Rajya Sabha that the MOD will not alter the rank equivalence tabulations between armed forces officers and Armed Forces Headquarters Civil Service (AFHQ CS) circulated by MOD on 18 October 2016. When asked in the Rajya sabha, whether the MOD was considering "correcting the discrepancies that have arisen as a result of this disturbance of rank equations", he replied the question "does not arise".

See also
 One Rank One Pension Scheme
 Rank Pay
 Sixth Central Pay Commission
 7th Central Pay Commission (CPC) and Defence Forces
 Defence pensions, India
 Indian Ex Servicemen Movement
 Department of Ex-servicemen Welfare

References

Military history of India
Military of India
Ministry of Defence (India)
Military pay and benefits
Pensions in India
Veterans' affairs in India